The following is a list of notable medical doctors from New Zealand.

 Louis Barnett – surgeon
 Sir Brian Barratt-Boyes – cardiac surgeon
 Agnes Bennett – doctor and medical officer in World War I
 John Daniel Bergin – neurologist
 Alice Bush – doctor, paediatrician and campaigner for family planning services and abortion access
 Margaret Cruickshank – first registered female doctor in New Zealand
 Sylvia Gytha de Lancey Chapman – medical superintendent 
 Charles Farthing – pioneer in the treatment of AIDS
 Isaac Featherston – politician
 Erich Geiringer – founder of the New Zealand Medical Association
 David Gerrard – swimmer, Professor of Sports Medicine at University of Otago Dunedin School of Medicine. Former New Zealand Olympic chef de mission
 Sir Harold Gillies – pioneering plastic surgeon
 Felicity Goodyear-Smith – doctor and medical academic at the University of Auckland
 Herb Green – specialist at the centre of the Cartwright Inquiry
 Elizabeth Gunn – doctor and founder of the Children's Health Camp movement
 Ian Hassall – paediatrician 
 Te Rangi Hīroa (also known as Sir Peter Henry Buck) – member of the Ngāti Mutunga Māori iwi 
 Fred Hollows – ophthalmologist
 Paul Hutchison – politician
 Tracy Inglis – Auckland medical practitioner
 Sir Truby King – child-care pioneer
 Ivan Lichter – thoracic surgeon
 Sir Robert Macintosh – pioneering anaesthetist
 Sir Archibald McIndoe – pioneering plastic surgeon
 Brad McKay, doctor, author and television personality
 Rainsford Mowlem – pioneering plastic surgeon
 Courtney Nedwill – doctor and public health officer
 James Newman (geriatrician) – geriatrician and medical superintendent
 Thomas Moore Philson – doctor and hospital superintendent
 Cecily Pickerill – plastic surgeon
 Sir Henry Pickerill – plastic surgeon
 Denis Rogers – local-body politician
 Sir Edward Sayers – Methodist missionary; military medical administrator; consultant physician, then Dean, of the University of Otago Dunedin School of Medicine
 Jessie Scott – notable New Zealand doctor, medical officer and prisoner of war. 
 Emily Siedeberg – doctor, hospital superintendent and first female medical graduate in New Zealand
 Ebenezer Teichelmann – surgeon, mountaineer and photographer 
 Henry Thacker – Member of Parliament and Mayor of Christchurch
 Ronald Trubuhovich – pioneer in critical-care medicine
 Thomas Valintine – doctor and public health administrator
 Leslie Whetter – surgeon and Antarctic explorer
 Christine Coe Winterbourn – Professor of Pathology at the University of Otago

See also

Lists of New Zealanders
List of physicians

Doctors
Doctors
Lists of physicians
 
Doctors